Eduardo Ledesma Romo (born 20 April 1969) is a Mexican politician from the Ecologist Green Party of Mexico. From 2009 to 2012 he served as Deputy of the LXI Legislature of the Mexican Congress representing Baja California.

References

1969 births
Living people
Politicians from Tijuana
Ecologist Green Party of Mexico politicians
21st-century Mexican politicians
Deputies of the LXI Legislature of Mexico
Members of the Chamber of Deputies (Mexico) for Baja California